Sean, Shaun or Shawn Hill may refer to:

Sean Hill (born 1979), BBQ Pitmaster Texas Moonswiners
Sean Hill (ice hockey) (born 1970), American former ice hockey player
Sean Hill (scientist), American-Swiss neuroscientist
Sean Hill (American football) (born 1971), former American football defensive back
Sean Hill (writer), American writer
Shaun Hill (born 1980), American football quarterback
Shawn Hill (born 1981), Canadian former baseball player